Meenava Nanban is a 1977 Indian Tamil-language action drama film written and directed by Sridhar. The film stars M. G. Ramachandran and Latha, with M. N. Nambiar, Nagesh among others enacting supporting roles. It was released on 14 August 1977.

Plot 
Kumaran, an adventurer comes to a fishing enclave who help him. He meets the arrogant daughter of Nagaraj, Kamali, who treats them with disrespect and reforms her as they fall in love with each other in the process. He then takes it upon himself to defend the fishermen exploited by Nagaraj. Together with Kamali, they reform Nagaraj while saving him from the bad guys, Arun and Selvaraj, he associates with who turn on him.

Cast 
M. G. Ramachandran as Kumaran
Latha as Kamali
Vennira Aadai Nirmala as Shanti
Sachu as Muthamma
V. K. Ramasamy as Nagaraj
M. N. Nambiar as Arun
P. S. Veerappa as Selvaraj
Nagesh as Ratnam
Thengai Srinivasan as Manickam
K. Kannan as Mahi
K. K. Soundar as In charge of Coolie
Karikol Raju as Fisherman
T. K. S. Natarajan as Varadhan
Loose Mohan as Fisherman

Production 
After the success of Urimaikural (1974), Sridhar decided to make another film with M. G. Ramachandran titled Naanum Oru Thozhilali; however it got dropped after Sridhar felt it lacked a strong plot. Sadayappa Chettiar approached Sridhar expressing interest to produce a film with Ramachandran as lead actor and Sridhar directing. Sridhar named the film as Latchiya Kanavu while simultaneously making another film with Ramachandran titled Anna Nee En Deivam. Sridhar later changed the title from Latchiya Kanavu to Meenava Nanban as per Ramachandran's suggestion. Meenava Nanban was the second and final collaboration of Ramachandran with Sridhar, after Urimaikural. Santhana Bharathi, who worked as assistant director, recalled that another famous director P. Vasu joined as assistant in the film's unit.

Ramachandran performed his own stunt in a scene by jumping from a  building, but sustained no injuries. A few scenes of Meenava Nanban were shot at Manipal. The filming was stopped for a few months because Sridhar met with an accident, damaging his left eye. After the operation, Sridhar restarted both films - Meenava Nanban and Anna Nee En Deivam - at the same time. During that time, Ramachandran won the 1977 elections and became the chief minister of Tamil Nadu, due to which Anna Nee En Deivam was shelved after canning few scenes but Sridhar completed Meenava Nanban with climax was shot in a set of a boat resembling flood in studio. Ramachandran wore a wig to portray his character, and ensured it remained consistent throughout the course of production to preserve continuity.

Soundtrack 
The soundtrack was composed by M. S. Viswanathan and lyrics written by Muthulingam, Vaali and Pulamaipithan. Muthulingam recalled that Ramachandran discovered that he did not write any song, he insisted him to write the song "Thangathil Mugam Eduthu". The song "Pongum Kadalosai" is based on Valaji raga.

References

External links 
 

1970s action drama films
1970s Tamil-language films
1977 films
Films directed by C. V. Sridhar
Films scored by M. S. Viswanathan
Films with screenplays by C. V. Sridhar
Indian action drama films